Trichophysetis fulvifusalis is a moth in the family Crambidae. It is found in Australia, where it has been recorded from Queensland.

This species has a wingspan of 18mm for the male. The wings are pale brown with two wavy dark lines and one or two dark dots.

References

Cybalomiinae
Moths described in 1903
Moths of Australia